Saavira Kambada Temple or Tribhuvana Tilaka Cūḍāmaṇi), is a basadi or Jain temple noted for its 1000 pillars in Moodabidri, Karnataka, India. The temple is also known as "Chandranatha Temple" since it honours the tirthankara Chandraprabha, whose eight-foot idol is worshipped in the shrine.

The town of Moodabidri is noted for its 18 Jain temples, but Saavira Kambada Temple is considered the finest among them. The temple is considered an architectural wonder and is a major attraction of Moodabidri.

History
The Basadi was built by the local chieftain, Devaraya Wodeyar in 1430 and took 31 years to complete, additions to temples were made in 1962. The shrine has a 50 feet tall monolith manasthambha erected by Karkala Bhairava Queen Nagala Devi.

Architecture 

The temple is considered an architectural wonder. The temple is full of elaborate sculptures and decoration. The doorway of the temple has intricate carvings and is enclosed with ornate walls. The massive pillars of the temple are carved to resemble an octagonal wooden log with one baring inscription. The 1000 pillars with exquisite detail, support the temple and no two pillars are alike. The sloping roof of veranda are made of wood coated with copper tiles resembling the temples of Nepal. The temple complex has seven mandapas supported by beautifully carved pillars built in the Vijayanagara style. The main mandapa of the temple consists of two interconnected column halls. The fourth mandapa houses a sculpture of Bhairavadevi. The top two storeys are carved in wood and the lowest one in stone.

The hall interiors are massive, with elaborately decorated columns and a door flanked by two protector deities. The wooden panels inside the temples have carvings of Tirthankara flanked by elephants, guardian deities and female attendants holding flowers. Several bronze Jain idols in ornated frames are placed inside the garbhagriha. The 8 ft idol of Chandranatha Swami made of panchadhatu present in the garbha griha. The temple are built similar to temples in Nepal. The interiors of the temple are richly and variedly carved. A large number of tombs of Jain monks are present near the temple premise. The manastambha in front of the temple is noteworthy. The pillars inside the hall bear carvings of dragon and giraffe resulting from the influence of trade with China in 15th century. The image of Nandishwar-dweep dated 16th century is notable.

Saavira Kambada Basadi along with Shravanabelagola, Kamal Basadi and Brahma Jinalaya are considerest the most important Jain centers in Karnataka.

Other Jain Temples in Moodabidri

Guru Basadi

Guru basadi is the earliest of the Jain monuments built in 714 AD. The temples also house 12th-century Jain palm leaf manuscripts known as ‘Dhavala texts’ are preserved. These texts were brought from shravanabelagola to here during the Mughal invasion. This basadi is also called Siddantha Basadi and Hale Basadi.

Other 
Moodabidri is noted for its 18 Jain Temples mentioned as follows:
 Bagada Basadi
 Settara Basadi
 Hire Basadi
 Guru Basadi
 Leppada Basadi
 Kallu Basadi
 Batkana-Thikari Basadi
 Pathshala Basadi
 Padu Basadi
 Kere Basadi
 Hosa Basadi
 Bitkeri Basadi
 Vikram Shetty Basadi
 Mahadeva Shetty Basadi
 Chola Shetty Basadi
 Koti Shetty Basadi
 Derma Shetty Basadi
 Ammanavara Basadi

Moodabidri Jain Math
There is a matha at Moodabidri responsible for the upkeep and maintenance of temples in Moodabidri. It is known as the Jain Varanasi of the South.

Bhaṭṭāraka Charukeerthi
A bhaṭṭāraka seat exists at Moodabidri responsible for administering the 18 temples at Moodabidri and the other temples in the surrounding areas. The name given to the bhaṭṭāraka of Moodabidri is Charukeerthi.

In popular culture 
The temple is listed as one of the temples in the Fodor's "India's Jain Temples Are Incredible Architectural Marvels" series.

Gallery

See also

Chaturmukha Basadi
Jain Bunt
Jainism in Karnataka

References

Citation

Sources

Books

Web

External links

Jain temples in Karnataka
15th-century Jain temples